WELB (1350 AM) is a radio station licensed to serve the community of Elba, Alabama.  The station is owned by Rhett S. Snellgrove.  It airs a Southern Gospel music format.

The station was assigned the WELB call letters by the Federal Communications Commission.

History
In May 2008, the Elba Radio Company (Doug Holderfield, president) reached an agreement to sell WELB to Rhett S. Snellgrove for a reported sale price of $60,000. The deal was approved by the FCC on June 13, 2008, and the transaction was consummated on July 1, 2008. At the time of the sale, WELB was broadcasting a mixed format of classic country and Southern Gospel music.  After the new owner took over, it changed to a full-time Southern Gospel format.

References

External links

Southern Gospel radio stations in the United States
ELB
Coffee County, Alabama
Radio stations established in 1987